William Corey may refer to:

 William Corey (Medal of Honor) (1853–?), U.S. Navy sailor and Medal of Honor recipient
 William Ellis Corey (1866–1934), president of the Carnegie Steel Company, and of U.S. Steel
 SS William E. Corey, a Great Lakes bulk freighter